Stephen Mopope (1898–1974) was a Kiowa painter, dancer, and Native American flute player from Oklahoma. He was the most prolific member of the group of artists known as the Kiowa Six.

Early life
Stephen Mopope was born on 27 August 1898 near the Redstone Baptist Mission on the Kiowa Reservation in Indian Territory. Qued Koi was his Kiowa name, which translates as "Painted Robe," and is sometimes spelled, "Wood Coy." His maternal grandfather was Appiatan, a famed Kiowa warrior, and his great-uncles were Silver Horn and Oheltoint (Ohettoint), both of whom were accomplished artists. Oheltoint was one of the Fort Marion ledger artists. Mopope's paternal grandfather was a Spanish captive, adopted by Kiowa chief Many Bears.

When Mopope was a young child, his relatives observed him drawing pictures in the sand, so the artists in his family taught him how to paint on hides in the traditional manner. His grandmother was also instrumental in his early education.

In 1916, Mopope attended St. Patrick's Indian Mission School in Anadarko, Oklahoma, where he received further art instruction under Sister Olivia Taylor, a Choctaw nun. In a move that contradicted US federal policy at the time, Susan Peters, the Kiowa agency field matron, arranged for Mrs. Willie Baze Lane, an artist from Chickasha, Oklahoma, to teach painting classes for young Kiowas in Anadarko. Recognizing the talent of some of the young artists, Peters convinced Swedish-American artist, Oscar Jacobson, director of the University of Oklahoma's School of Art to accept the Kiowa students into a special program at the school, in which they were coached and encouraged by Edith Mahier.

Kiowa Six
The Kiowa Six included Mopope as well as fellow artists Spencer Asah, James Auchiah, Jack Hokeah, Lois Smoky and Monroe Tsatoke. Auchiah was the last to join the group at OU in 1926.

In 1928, the Kiowa Six made their debut into the international fine arts world, when they participated in the First International Art Exposition in Prague, Czechoslovakia. Dr. Jacobson arranged for their work to be shown in several other countries and for Kiowa Art, a portfolio of pochoir prints and artists' paintings, to be published in France.

Art career 

Mopope was commissionined to paint murals in the US Department of the Interior building in Washington, DC, along with five other Native aristists, including James Auchiah. Mopope's mural was 6 by 60 feet and portrayed a Kiowa ceremonial dance.

He joined the Native American Church and created stylized paintings that combined ceremonial implements with religious imagery. Besides being a visual artist, he was a highly accomplished dancer and flute-player.

Mopope's work was part of Stretching the Canvas: Eight Decades of Native Painting (2019–21), a survey at the National Museum of the American Indian George Gustav Heye Center in New York.

Mopope's granddaughter Vanessa Jennings is a Kiowa/Apache/Pima beadwork artist and regalia maker.

Public collections
Mopope's work can be found in the following public art collections:

Anadarko City Museum
Anadarko Community Library
Bank of America Collection, Phoenix, Arizona
Brigham City Museum of Art & History, Brigham City, Utah
City of Anadarko
Cleveland Museum of Art
Dartmouth College Collection
Fred Jones Jr. Museum of Art
The George Gustav Heye Center
Gilcrease Museum
Heard Museum
Indian Arts and Crafts Board, US Department of the Interior
Mabee-Gerrer Museum of Art
McNay Art Museum
Museum of Northern Arizona, Katherine Harvey Collection
Museum of New Mexico
Millicent Rogers Museum
National Gallery of Art
Oklahoma Art Center
Oklahoma Historical Society
Oklahoma Museum of Natural History
Oklahoma State Art Collection
Oklahoma Science and Art Foundation, Gerrer Collection
Peabody Essex Museum
Philbrook Museum of Art
Southwest Museum
Seminole Public Library
Smithsonian American Art Museum
Southern Plains Indian Museum
University of Oklahoma, Library
Wheelwright Museum of the American Indian
Woolaroc Museum

Death
On 2 February 1974, Mopope died at Fort Cobb, Oklahoma.

Notes

References
Lester, Patrick D. The Biographical Directory of Native American Painters. Norman and London: The Oklahoma University Press, 1995. .
Swan, Daniel C. Peyote Religious Art: Symbols and Faith and Belief. Jackson, University of Mississippi Press, 1999. .
Wyckoff, Lydia L., ed. Visions and voices : Native American painting from the Philbrook Museum of Art. Tulsa, OK: Philbrook Museum of Art, 1996. .

External links

 Jacobson House Native Art Center: About the Kiowa Six
 Stephen Mopope, article from the Oklahoma Historical Society

Kiowa people
Native American painters
1898 births
1974 deaths
Painters from Oklahoma
People from Anadarko, Oklahoma
Native American Church
American people of Spanish descent
20th-century American painters
American male painters
Native American male artists
Native American dancers
Dancers from Oklahoma
20th-century Native Americans
20th-century American male artists